Boyolali is a regency in the eastern part of Central Java province in Indonesia. It covers an area of 1,015.10 km2, and had a population of 930,531 at the 2010 census and 1,062,713 at the 2020 census.

History
The anniversary of the founding of Boyolali is celebrated on June 5, as the government of Kasunanan Surakarta created a new rule about the village government or the government outside the Kuthanegara (Capital City) on June 5, 1847. The rule was adopted pursuant to the treaty of Serat Perjanjian Dalem Natha entered into between Pakubuwono VII and the Dutch Government in the belief that the incumbent government was unable to fully function. The treaty is in the treaty of Serat Perjanjian Dalem Natha page 140 – 146 or in Staatsblad 1847 No. 30. Chapter 30 – 36. According to Staatsblad in 1847 No.30, the Government of Kasunanan Surakarta formed six "Mountain Regencies" in its surrounding area to help the government in those regions. The six regions were the City of Surakarta and the Regencies of Kartosuro, Klaten, Boyolali, Ampel and Sragen. (Pawarti Surakarta, 1939:71). Based on that Staatsblad later on known as the anniversary of the regency Boyolali was June 5, 1847.

Geography and Climate

Geography
The capital city, also named Boyolali, lies 27 km to the west of Solo.
The regency covers an area of approximately 1,015.10 km2 with the highest point being Mount Merbabu - 3,141 m.

Boyolali is located at the east foothill of Mount Merapi and Mount Merbabu, which has very beautiful and charming scenery, the spacious greens and hilly area around the volcanic activity of Merapi provides enchanting opportunities for sightseeing.

Boyolali also has tourist attractions in the form of a natural spring that flows continuously and very clearly, as well as water attractions, swimming pool, fishing pond and restaurants like the Tlatar (about 7 km north Boyolali city) and in District Pengging Banyudono (about 10 km east of the town of Boyolali).

Climate
Boyolali has a tropical monsoon climate (Am) according to Köppen climate classification. Average temperature varies little from month to month. October is warmest with an average temperature of 25.2 °C. July is coldest with an average temperature of 23.7 °C. The wet season has a rainfall peak around March. The dry season centers around the month of August, which has the most sunshine.

Places of interest
 Mount Merapi, the most active volcano in Indonesia. Can be reached through Selo district.
 Umbul Tlatar, natural spring pool located 7 km to the north of Boyolali.
 Umbul Pengging, natural spring pool at Banyudono district.
 Kedung Ombo Dam, mainly used for irrigation purposes.
 Woodball Course Tlatar, Woodball Arena inside Umbul Tlatar area.

Adjacent areas
Boyolali Regency is surrounded by other regencies: Klaten Regency and Yogyakarta province in the south; Sukoharjo, Karanganyar and Sragen regencies and Solo city in the east; Semarang Regency and Grobogan Regency in the north; and Magelang Regency in the west.

Administrative districts 
At the time of the 2010 census, Boyolali Regency comprised nineteen districts (kecamatan), but subsequently three additional districts (Gladagsari, Tamansari and Wonosamodro) have been created by splitting off parts of existing districts. The twenty-two districts are tabulated below with their areas and their populations at the 2010 census and the 2020 census. The table also gives the location of the district administrative centres and the number of villages (rural desa and urban kelurahan) in each district.

Notes: (a) the 2010 population is included with the figure for Ampel District, from which the western part was cut out. (b) the 2010 population is included with the figure for Musuk District, from which the southern part was cut out. (c) the 2010 population is included with the figure for Wonosegoro District, from which the western part was cut out; the same alteration also moved part of Kemusu District into Wonosegoro District.

Transportation
Intercity buses
Dokar, two-wheel carriage powered by horse
Pedicab (Indonesian: Becak)
Angkota, minibus

References

External links

  Official website

 
Solo River